Teddy Riley, the First Expansion In Asia is the debut extended play by South Korean girl group, Rania, released on April 6, 2011, by DR Music and Yedang Company. It is the only release by the group to feature the original eight-member lineup, as member Yijo left the group shortly after the EP's release.

Background
The album's lead single, "Dr Feel Good," was composed, written, and produced by Teddy Riley, who originally made the song for Lady Gaga.

Promotion
Rania promoted their debut with showcases in Thailand, Cambodia,  Singapore, the Philippines, Taiwan, Hong Kong, Malaysia, Indonesia, Laos, and Vietnam. Member Yijo was absent in promotions due to visa issues.

Reception
Rania's debut was met with mixed reviews in Korea, as many viewers found the group's image too provocative. As a result, Rania were forced to change their choreography and make minor changes to the outfits. Riley himself announced he would disassociate himself with the group as he believed that the group and comeback were attempts to use him for his name and status. Despite this, singles "Dr. Feel Good" and "Masquerade both charted at 99 and 192 on the GAON chart respectively.

Track list

References

2011 debut EPs
Rania (band) albums
Albums produced by Teddy Riley